The Generally Accepted Government Auditing Standards (GAGAS), commonly referred to as the "Yellow Book", are produced in the United States by the Government Accountability Office (GAO).

The standards apply to both financial and performance audits of government agencies.  Five general standards are included:

 Independence
 Due care
 Continuing professional education (CPE) 80 hours every 2 years, 24 hours directly related to government auditing
 Supervision
 Quality control

The Yellow Book standards are used by auditors who examine the federal government, including the Government Accountability Office, various offices of inspectors general, and others.  Many local government performance auditors also use the yellow book standards.  In addition, CPA firms that perform local government financial audits that include an A-133 "single audit" must follow yellow book standards.

In addition to financial audits, the Yellow Book standards cover Performance Audits, which evaluate the performance of a program or project against defined objectives, such as objectives for efficiency and effectiveness.

Other government auditing standards, used by supreme audit institutions 
The International Organization of Supreme Audit Institutions (INTOSAI) has developed the INTOSAI Auditing Standards

References

See also
 GAO Yellow book requirements 

 CGAP (Certified Government Auditing Professional) certificate of the Institute of Internal Auditors
Comptroller

Auditing in the United States
Financial regulation in the United States
Government Accountability Office
Auditing standards